Fernando Ávalos may refer to:

Fernando Cuéllar Ávalos (1945–2008), Peruvian footballer and coach
Fernando Horacio Ávalos (born 1978), Argentine footballer
Fernando Ávalos (governor), Governor of Querétaro, Mexico, 1923

See also
Fernando d'Ávalos (1489–1525), Italian-Spanish military commander
Francesco Ferdinando d'Ávalos (1530–1571), Italian-Spanish military commander and governor